Solidarity of Women of Ukraine is a Ukrainian political party that was registered on 23 December 1999.

The party was created in base of the public organization "All-Ukrainian Female Union Solidarity" that existed since 1994. Solidarity of Women of Ukraine participated in parliamentary elections for the first time in 2002, but did not win any seats. In 2004 it supported Viktor Yanukovych as a presidential candidate. In 2006 the party participated in the electoral bloc "Yevhen Marchuk - Unity" which won 0.06% and Solidarity of Women of Ukraine did not receive any representation in parliament. There is no information about the party participating in following elections until 2014.

In 2014 Solidarity received 0.66% on the party list voting and did not win any constituencies.

External links

  
 Description
 Party list for the 2014 elections
 Profile

Political parties in Ukraine